James Lowe (born 4 November 1982) is a former English cricketer. He was a right-handed batsman, off-spin bowler and wicket-keeper who played for Durham. He was born in Bury St Edmunds.

Lowe's first-class career began following some solid performances in the Second XI in the 2002 season. Lowe made an impressive 80 before being caught lbw in his debut first-class innings the following year, a score which, for as long as he played, would remain his highest score in a First-class match.

However, Lowe played only four matches in the next three years for the first team, instead playing Second XI cricket, while in 2004 Lowe was part of the team which reached the semi-finals of the Second XI Trophy competition. During this same period Lowe represented Philadelphia in the North East Premier League, where he would play until 2006, the year in which he saw out his first-class career.

Lowe is no longer a squad-member as of the 2007 season. Throughout his short career he was an opening batsman, initially full of promise, but released before being able to get into the swing of a regular team place.

External links
James Lowe at Cricket Archive 

1982 births
English cricketers
Living people
Durham cricketers
Sportspeople from Bury St Edmunds
Cumberland cricketers